Elias Bradshaw was a Michigan politician.

Early life 
Bradshaw was born in Canada on an unknown date. During his time in Canada, he refused to fight in the War of 1812, and as punishment was imprisoned as an American sympathizer. After this, he moved to Michigan on an unknown date before 1831.

Political career 
In 1835, Bradshaw was sworn in as a member of the Michigan House of Representatives from the Wayne County district as a Democratic. He serve in this position until 1836. In 1837, Bradshaw was a county surveyor. When he left this position in 1841, he became an associate judge.

References

Democratic Party members of the Michigan House of Representatives
County officials in Michigan
19th-century American politicians
19th-century American judges
Pre-Confederation Canadian emigrants to the United States